Serkan Aykut (born 24 February 1975) is a retired Turkish footballer. He played in the striker position.

Aykut started to play at Samsunspor. After becoming top scorer with 30 goals in the season 1999-2000, he transferred to Galatasaray SK for $ 5.9 million. He played two seasons for Galatasaray SK successfully and won the UEFA Super Cup in 2000.

Aykut signed a contract with his former club Samsunspor in July 2002 for four years and one additional year as option. He is recently captain of the team at Samsunspor.

Honours 
 Galatasaray
 UEFA Super Cup: 1 (2000)
 Süper Lig: 1 (2001-02)

See also 
 Top goalscorers in Turkey

References

 TFF Profile

External links

1975 births
Living people
Footballers from Ankara
Turkish footballers
Turkey international footballers
Turkey under-21 international footballers
Turkey youth international footballers
Galatasaray S.K. footballers
Samsunspor footballers
Süper Lig players

Association football forwards
Mediterranean Games silver medalists for Turkey
Competitors at the 1997 Mediterranean Games
Mediterranean Games medalists in football